Shaibu Yakubu (born November 2, 1986, in Obuasi) is a Ghanaian football player who plays for Adıyamanspor in Turkey.

Career
In 2008 Yakubu  moved to Hacettepe Spor Kulübü in the Süper Lig, before joining Kartalspor in 2009. Then he moved to Greek club OFI Crete before a summer 2011 switch to Enosis Neon Paralimni in the Cypriot First Division.

References

External links
Shaibu Yakubu at Soccerway
Profile at FutStats

1986 births
Ghanaian footballers
Ghana international footballers
Ghanaian expatriate footballers
Expatriate footballers in Turkey
Expatriate footballers in Greece
Expatriate footballers in Cyprus
Living people
Ashanti Gold SC players
Kartalspor footballers
Hacettepe S.K. footballers
OFI Crete F.C. players
Enosis Neon Paralimni FC players
1461 Trabzon footballers
Petrojet SC players
Adıyamanspor footballers
Ghanaian expatriate sportspeople in Cyprus
Süper Lig players
TFF First League players
Cypriot First Division players
People from Obuasi
Association football midfielders
Ghana Premier League top scorers